Pip, PIP, Pips, PIPS, and similar, may refer to:

Common meanings
 Pip, colloquial name for the star(s) worn on military uniform as part of rank badge, as in the British Army officer rank insignia or with many Commonwealth police agencies
 The seed of some fruits
 Pip (counting), a small but easily countable item, such as the dots on dice or symbols on playing cards
 Pip (dominoes), a dot on a domino tile

Arts, entertainment and media
 "Pip" (South Park), a 2000 episode of South Park
 The Pips, the backup singers in the musical group Gladys Knight & the Pips
 Providence Initiative for Psychogeographic Studies, an art group
 PiP Animation Services, a Canadian animation studio
 The Pip, the nickname of a clandestine radio station of Russian origin
 BBC Pips or The Pips, a timing signal broadcast by the BBC

Finance and management
 Percentage in point, a currency exchange rate fluctuation
 Performance improvement plan, a management technique
 Personal Independence Payment, a welfare benefit in the United Kingdom
 Personal injury protection, a type of car insurance
 Policy-ineffectiveness proposition, an economic theory

People
 Pip (nickname), a list of people with the nickname
 Pip (musician) (born 1992), contestant on Season 2 of NBC's TV show The Voice
 Pip Millett, English musician Georgia Willacy
 Pip Simmonds, New Zealand freestyle skier
 Scroobius Pip (born 1981), alias of rapper David Meads
 Josef Priller (1915–1961), German fighter ace nicknamed "Pips"

Fictional characters
 Pip (Great Expectations), Philip Pirrip from the Charles Dickens' novel Great Expectations
 Pip Pirrup, a student at South Park Elementary in South Park 
 Pip (Moby-Dick character)
 Peregrin Took, in J. R. R. Tolkien's fantasy The Lord of the Rings
 Pip, a major character in The Railway Series of books 
 Pip, in the British newspaper strip cartoon Pip, Squeak and Wilfred
 Pip (Chrono Cross)
 Pip the Troll, a Marvel Comics character
 Pip, in the Grailquest gamebook series
 Pip Bernadotte, in the manga Hellsing
 Pip, an Animaniacs character
 Pip, in the Nickelodeon animated show Back at the Barnyard
 Pip, a nickname of Chiana, in the Australian television series Farscape
 Pip, in the film The Halloween Tree
 Pip, a persona featured on the Tori Amos album American Doll Posse
 Pips, a fictional fairy in the animated film FernGully: The Last Rainforest and its sequel
 Pip, an animated chipmunk in the Disney live-action/animated film Enchanted
 Pip, an otter in the television series Bear in the Big Blue House
 Pip the Penguin, in the animated series T.O.T.S.

Schools
 Pakistan International Public School and College (PIPS), a private residential school in Abbottabad, Pakistan
 Pakistan Institute of Physics, a physics research institute of the University of Engineering and Technology, Lahore in Pakistan

Politics and government
 Pakistan Institute for Parliamentary Services, a Pakistani government institution
 Police information point, a kiosk run by British police
 Peruvian Investigative Police, a plainclothes police unit
 Puerto Rican Independence Party, a political party
 Personal Independence Payment, a British welfare benefit

Science and technology

 Greenwich Time Signal, popularly known as the pips
 Predicted impact point, the location at which a projectile is expected to strike
 Profile ignition pickup, a term in automotive technology
 Proper indecomposable past set, a causal relation in a Lorentzian manifold
 Picture-in-picture, a video stream playing within an inset window of a TV or device screen

Biology and medicine
 Peak inspiratory pressure (PIP), in mechanical ventilation
 Plasma membrane intrinsic protein, a class of plant aquaporins
 Poly Implant Prothèse, a former French breast implants manufacturer
 Polymerization induced phase separation
 Prolactin-induced protein, a protein in humans
 Proximal interphalangeal joints, interphalangeal joints of the hand
 Pairwise-invasibility plot in evolutionary invasion analysis
 Psychosis-intermittent hyponatremia-polydipsia (PIP) syndrome
 Pug impression pad, an object used for the census of tigers

Computing
 Peripheral Interchange Program, a DEC and CP/M file transfer utility
 Point in polygon, a concept in computational geometry
 Policy Information Point, in eXtensible Access Control Markup Language
 Private Internet Protocol
 pip (package manager), a Python package installer
 P.I.P.S. Is POSIX on Symbian, known as P.I.P.S.
 Precision Time Protocol Industry Profile, an IEC 62439-3 standard

Other uses
 Battle of the Pips, an incident in World War II
 Palisades Interstate Parkway, a highway in New York and New Jersey, United States
 Pip Cliffs, Graham Land, Antarctica
 IATA code for Pilot Point Airport, Pilot Point, Alaska, United States

See also

 Phosphatidylinositol 3-phosphate, also known as PI(3)P
 Phosphatidylinositol 4-phosphate, also known as PI(4)P
 Phosphatidylinositol 5-phosphate, also known as PI(5)P
 The Pip-Boy, a wrist computer in the Fallout video games
 
 
 Pipp (disambiguation), including pipps